Ismail Hossain Khan was one of the former MPs of Indian parliament from Barpeta constituency.

Early life and education
Khan was born in a small village kumullipara in Barpeta, Assam, and completed his education from DPHS school, and later earned his LLB from Gawhati University.

Career
Khan came into politics in the year 1965 becoming two time MP from Barpeta.  After retiring from politics he did social service for poor and illiterate people.

References

Indian National Congress politicians from Assam
Indian deaf people
Lok Sabha members from Assam
People from Barpeta district
Year of birth missing (living people)
People from Barpeta
India MPs 1977–1979
India MPs 1980–1984